Eresus robustus is a spider species found in Spain.

See also 
 List of Eresidae species

References

External links 

Eresidae
Spiders of Europe
Fauna of Spain
Spiders described in 1918